Midway Studios San Diego (known as THQ San Diego from 2009 to 2012) was a game developer based in San Diego, California. It was the successor to the Leland Corporation and Cinematronics.

History
In 1994, Midway Games parent WMS Industries bought the Texas-based game publisher Tradewest and its San Diego-based subsidiary studio Leland Corporation to expand into home console publishing. Tradewest became known briefly as Williams Entertainment before being renamed Midway Home Entertainment in 1996; the San Diego studio was renamed Midway Studios San Diego. The two offices were combined in 2001. In addition to original games, Midway San Diego developed home-console versions of arcade games produced by sibling studios Midway Studios Chicago (the original Midway Manufacturing Company), and Midway Games West, the former Atari Games, the arcade division of the original Atari Inc., which Midway acquired in 1996 and was closed in 2004. 

On July 10, 2009, Midway confirmed all their remaining assets would be sold off to Warner Bros. Interactive Entertainment. Midway Studios San Diego however was not included and would be closed down. On August 9, THQ announced they had acquired the studio from Midway for $200,000. The sale of the studio included all assets, except for the TNA franchise which went to SouthPeak Games. (THQ San Diego would keep the source code for the original 2008 game.)

The first game the developer released under the new name was the game WWE All Stars. THQ would later make them the main developer for future UFC licensed games, but it on June 4, 2012, THQ announced that not only that the UFC license would be sold to Electronic Arts, but they would also close THQ San Diego. Each of its assets were sold individually, such as the WWE license going to Take-Two Interactive and the Darksiders license going to Nordic Games GmbH. Nordic would later buy the THQ name and become THQ Nordic, but the San Diego studio remained closed.

Games

References

THQ
Midway Games
Video game companies established in 1997
Video game companies disestablished in 2012
Companies based in San Diego
Defunct video game companies of the United States
Video game development companies
Defunct companies based in California
1997 establishments in California
2012 disestablishments in California